= Xavier B. Fernández =

Spanish writer and journalist

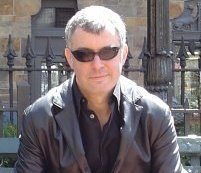
Xavier Fernández

Xavier B. Fernández (born 1960, Barcelona) is a Spanish writer and journalist. He studied information science at the Universidad Autónoma de Barcelona and went on to work for a variety of local papers, among them Els 4 Cantons, El Punt, and Diari de Terrassa.

In 1994, he made his debut as a screenwriter, penning scripts for episodes of the TV series Detective Bogey. He also worked on series such as El patito feo, Los tres ositos and Bandolero. In 2006, the Mexican publisher Resistencia brought out his novel Kensington Gardens, which became a cult favorite of punk and emo teenagers. He has published half a dozen books until date.
